Tatyana Davydova (born 26 June 2000) is a Kazakhstani handball player for Kaysar Club and the Kazakhstani national team.

She represented Kazakhstan at the 2019 World Women's Handball Championship.

References

2000 births
Living people
Kazakhstani female handball players
Handball players at the 2018 Asian Games
21st-century Kazakhstani women